Her Triumph is a 1915 American silent drama film starring French dancer and actress Gaby Deslys, distributed by Paramount Pictures. The film was financed by the American film company Famous Players and shot in Paris. Her Triumph is now considered lost.

Production
Her Triumph was Deslys' first American feature film, and was a dramatic retelling of her career. Her dancing partner Harry Pilcer co-stars in the film. Daniel Frohman produced and was Gaby Deslys' American stage manager.

Cast
Gaby Deslys - Gaby
Harry Pilcer - Claude Devereux

References

External links
 

1915 films
1915 drama films
Silent American drama films
American silent feature films
American black-and-white films
Famous Players-Lasky films
Films shot in Paris
Lost American films
Paramount Pictures films
1915 lost films
Lost drama films
1910s American films